Magdalene (stylised in all caps) is the second studio album by English singer-songwriter FKA Twigs. It was released on 8 November 2019 by Young Turks. It is her first project since her EP M3LL155X (2015), and first full-length record since LP1 (2014). The album features a sole guest appearance from American rapper Future. FKA Twigs produced the album herself, with a wide range of co-producers including Nicolás Jaar, Koreless, Daniel Lopatin, Skrillex, Benny Blanco, Michael Uzowuru and Noah Goldstein, who also served as executive producer alongside Twigs.

The singles "Cellophane", "Holy Terrain", "Home with You", and "Sad Day" were released on 24 April, 9 September, 7 October, and 4 November, respectively. The album was supported by the Magdalene Tour.

Background
On 9 September 2019, FKA Twigs announced that her second studio album Magdalene would be released on 25 October; the album preorder and track listing were made available the same day. The album cover was designed by English artist Matthew Stone.

Barnett wrote in a press release announcing her second studio album:  The album was inspired by her 2017 breakup with actor Robert Pattinson.

Musical style
On Magdalene, twigs crafts electronic art pop, fusing it with "lurid" modern dance and "carnal" soul music. However, it is also described as "[defying] both genre and classification". This embrace of "adventurous" experimentation echoes musicians like Björk and Kate Bush. It features elements of pop, avant-garde, R&B, trap, hip hop, trip hop, alt-pop, punk rock, industrial, opera, chamber pop, and Bulgarian folk.

Promotion

Singles
The lead single "Cellophane" was released on 24 April 2019. The second single "Holy Terrain" featuring American rapper Future was released on 9 September. "Home with You" was released on 7 October after the album's release date was pushed from 25 October to 8 November. "Sad Day" was released on 4 November.

Tour

For the Magdalene album tour, FKA Twigs learned pole dancing and wushu.

Critical reception

Magdalene was met with widespread critical acclaim. At Metacritic, which assigns a normalised rating out of 100 to reviews from mainstream publications, the album received an average score of 88, based on 28 reviews. Aggregator AnyDecentMusic? gave it 8.5 out of 10, based on their assessment of the critical consensus.

Heather Phares of AllMusic gave a positive review, stating "At once more delicate and more concentrated than any of her previous work, Magdalene is a testament to the strength and skill it takes to make music this fragile and revealing. Like the dancer she is, Barnett pushes through pain in pursuit of beauty and truth, and the leaps she makes are breathtaking". Alexandra Pollard of The Independent said, "The follow-up to 2014's LP1 is the sound of a woman teetering on the brink of collapse, gathering herself, and then erupting into a kind of defiance". Magdalene was named "Album of the Week" by The Line of Best Fit, and reviewer Jack Bray called it the "fullest and most developed work from FKA Twigs to date", writing that Barnett "comprehensively opens herself up to consider the traumas of her past. It is an unsparing, anguished release in which we see an artist laid bare and tapping into a more natural and resonant version of her sound and self". Reviewing the album for NME, El Hunt stated: "Tahliah Barnett's been to tabloid hell and back and experienced gruelling ill-health, all of which is explored on her huge, panoramic second album." The Daily Telegraphs Neil McCormick wrote, "Magdalene is a magnificently twisted sci-fi torch album, an enthralling account of love, loss, heartbreak and recovery. It is erotic and neurotic, confounding and revelatory, summoning the spirits of such iconoclastic talents as David Bowie, Kate Bush and Björk while affirming its own unique personality". Exclaim! critic Ryan B. Patrick said, "The intent, execution and expression is pure. But the ominous feel of the entire project overwhelms, in parts, with a forlorn sense of distance and dread – which appears to be the point – yet its subsuming sense of femininity, sexuality, free will and determinism paradoxically draws us in".

Josh Gray from Clash enjoyed the album, saying, "Almost every track on Magdalene is built upwards from a simple piano line, hammering home the impression of someone delicately yet decisively knitting themselves back together after coming undone". Emily Mackay of The Observer saying "Magdalene is a much starker, more emotionally direct album than 2014's LP1, most noticeably in twigs's voice, which moves with sleek power from delicate operatic acrobatics to muscular intimacy. It's also bracingly frank". Pitchfork awarded Magdalene the distinction of "Best New Music", with Julianne Escobedo Shepherd describing it as "her best album so far", saying that it "is as introspective as anything she's written, but more obviously centers her voice as a conduit for plain emotion". In a mixed review, The Guardians Alexis Petridis stated: "Sometimes the results are stunning ... Sometimes, however, the songs are weirdly stifling."

Year-end lists

Track listing

Notes
  signifies an additional producer
  signifies a vocal producer
 All track titles are stylised in all lowercase.

Samples
 "Holy Terrain" contains a sample from "Moma Hubava", composed by Petar Lyondev, performed by Le Mystère des Voix Bulgares, conducted by Prof. Dora Hristova and recorded by KEXP.
 "Fallen Alien" contains a sample from "Storm Clouds Rising" by the Florida Mass Choir.

Personnel
Credits are adapted from the album's liner notes.

Musicians
 FKA Twigs – vocals, Tempest , drums , voice synth , additional programming 
 Nicolás Jaar – programming , synths , drums , piano , additional percussion 
 Ethan P. Flynn – piano , clarinet , keyboards 
 Cy An – keyboards , programming , drums , guitar , percussion loop 
 Noah Goldstein – programming , drums 
 Koreless – synths , synth strings , keyboards , programming , drums 
 Benny Blanco – synths , drums 
 Hudson Mohawke – drums 
 Skrillex – drums , programming 
 Future – vocals 
 Jack Antonoff – keyboards , drums , programming 
 Sounwave – drums , programming 
 Arca – vocal processing , synth programming 
 Andrés Osorio – guitar 
 Rick Nowels – synths 
 Motion Graphics – additional programming , woodwind programming , samples 
 Alex Epton – drums 
 Jeff Kleinman – piano , synths 
 Michael Uzowuru – drums , vocal percussion 
 Rob Moose – strings 

Technical
 Michael Peterson – engineering
 Noah Goldstein – engineering 
 Lee Avant – engineering
 Dean Reid – engineering
 Rick Nowels – engineering
 Alex Epton – engineering
 John Foyle – engineering, vocal recording 
 Laura Sisk – engineering 
 Jon Sher – assistant engineering 
 Tate McDowell – assistant engineering 
 Chris Wang – additional engineering 
 Manny Marroquin – mixing 
 Nicolas Jaar – mixing 
 Skrillex – mixing 
 Chris Galland – mix engineering 
 Robin Florent – mix assistance 
 Scott Desmarais – mix assistance 
 Joe LaPorta – mastering

Artwork
 Matthew Stone – artwork
 Matthew Josephs – creative direction
 Brodie Kaman – design

Charts

Release history

Notes

References

2019 albums
Albums produced by Jack Antonoff
Albums produced by Benny Blanco
Albums produced by Cashmere Cat
Albums produced by Sounwave
FKA Twigs albums
Young Turks (record label) albums
Electronic albums by English artists
Art pop albums
Albums produced by Michael Uzowuru